Grand Gulf may refer to:
 Grand Gulf, Mississippi
 USS Grand Gulf (1863)

 Battle of Grand Gulf

See also
 Grand Gulf Mound
 Grand Gulf Nuclear Generating Station